Kristin Sroka (23 May 1977, Leipzig) is a German rhythmic gymnast.

Sroka competed for Germany in the rhythmic gymnastics individual all-around competition at the 1996 Summer Olympics in Atlanta. There she was 14th in the qualification and advanced to the semifinal, in the semifinal she was 16th and didn't advance to the final of 10 competitors.

References

External links 
 
 

1981 births
Living people
German rhythmic gymnasts
Gymnasts at the 1996 Summer Olympics
Olympic gymnasts of Germany
Sportspeople from Leipzig